Mascara is a 1999 American comedy-drama film directed by Linda Kandel, starring Ione Skye, Lumi Cavazos and Amanda de Cadenet.

Cast
 Ione Skye as Rebecca
 Lumi Cavazos as Laura
 Amanda de Cadenet as Jennifer
 Steve Schub as Donnie
 Steve Jones as Nick
 Barry Del Sherman as Ken
 Tara Subkoff as Daphne
 Corey Page as Andrew
 Karen Black as Aunt Eloise

Reception
Joe Leydon of Variety called the film "reasonably well-acted but thoroughly inconsequential". Bill Gibron of PopMatters called the film a "chick flick that out distances Lifetime and Oxygen in the communal crisis arena." Don Houston of DVD Talk rated the film 2 stars out of 5. Kevin Thomas of the Los Angeles Times wrote that Kandel "reveals admirable commitment to her characters but is not sufficiently detached from them to provide her material with depth and perspective."

Marla Matzer of the Los Angeles Daily News rated the film 1.5 stars and called it "nicely made, well-acted independent film that unfortunately just doesn't have much to say." Jack Mathews of the New York Daily News rated the film 1 star and called it "tedious". TV Guide wrote that while "not every scene works", the film's "cumulative effect" is "very potent."

References

External links
 
 

American comedy-drama films
1999 comedy-drama films